Richard J. Durrell (ca. 1925 – March 7, 2008) was an American advertising executive and one of the founding staff members for  People magazine.''

Durrell turned down an offer to play baseball for the Brooklyn Dodgers franchise in order to attend the University of Minnesota, from which he was graduated in 1948.

For most of his career he worked for Time Inc., retiring in 1983. In his retirement years, he occasionally taught a course titled "Magazine Publication and Related Communications" at Sacred Heart University in Fairfield, Connecticut.

He was married to Jacquelyn Carmen (Dow) Durrell, a former Connecticut State Representative and First Selectman of Fairfield.

References

1920s births

2008 deaths
American magazine publishers (people)
University of Minnesota alumni
Sacred Heart University faculty
20th-century American businesspeople